Potomanto (derived from the French word portmanteau) is a 2013 Ghanaian-Nigerian action thriller film directed by Shirley Frimpong-Manso. It stars Olu Jacobs, Yvonne Okoro and Adjetey Anang. It premiered at Silverbird Cinemas, Accra, Ghana, on 20 December 2013.

Plot 
An angry ex-police officer, Andane, whose work is to investigate and catch unfaithful partners takes a different turn when he is hired to investigate the wife of a wealthy businessman. He stumbles on a ring of organ harvesters and traffickers who lure young men with a promise to take them abroad. The fiancé of the wealthy man is an undercover agent also undertaking an investigation to nab the organ traffickers. They join force in an attempt to stop the canker that has taken the lives of many of the youth in the community.

Cast
Olu Jacobs as Bankole
Adjetey Anang as Adane
Christabel Ekeh as Afia
Yvonne Okoro as Alice
Marie Humbert as Susan
 Mikki Osei Berko as Koranteng
 Senanu Gbedawo as Gyima
 Jason Nwoga as Jarreth
 Aniek An Iyoho as Shina
 Ian Oshodi as Nana
 Elorm Adablah as Coroner
 Kingsley Yamoah as Gabriel
 Fred Kanebi as Desmong
 John Bredu Peasah as Kwesi
 Victoria Johnson 
 Edem Agbenyame
 Amos Lamptet as Sakora
 Michael Antwi as Sakora's friend
 Charlotte Appleton as Kathy
 Evelyn Apene as Vincent's Mum
 Jennipha D. Dogbegah as James's Mistress
 Paul Pascal Therson as DSP James Ofori
 Godwin Namboh as Aboagye
 Farouk Moro Haruan as Bankole Security
 Benjamin Zion as Bankole Security
 Julius Ceasar as Bar Cleaner
 Elizabeth Anaba as Kelewele Seller
 George Sarpong as Dead Boy 1 in Morgue
 Felix Lomoin Morgue as Dead Boy 2 in Morgue
 Christian Ako Mensah as Kweku
 Anderson Ato Kwamen as Yaw
 Emmett Tumbay as Fight Bookie
 Frank Aidam as Fight Promoter

Reception
Nollywood Reinvented gave the film a 55% rating and praised its storyline and directing. Ghanafilmindustry.com followed with 4 out of 10 stars and concluded that the film was a cheap attempt towards greatness.

References

External links
 

2013 films
Ghanaian drama films
2013 action thriller films
Nigerian action thriller films
Best Editing Africa Movie Academy Award winners
Films directed by Shirley Frimpong-Manso
English-language Nigerian films
English-language Ghanaian films
2010s English-language films